No Scandal, also known as Keep It Quiet, is a 1999 French drama film directed by Benoît Jacquot and starring Fabrice Luchini, Isabelle Huppert and Vincent Lindon.

Cast
 Fabrice Luchini as Grégoire Jeancourt
 Isabelle Huppert as Agnès Jeancourt
 Vincent Lindon as Louis Jeancourt
 Vahina Giocante as Stéphanie
 Sophie Aubry as Véronique
 Andréa Parisy as Mme. Jeancourt
 Thérèse Liotard as Mme Guérin
 Ludovic Bergery as William
 Anne Fontaine as Nathalie
 Jean Davy as Edmond
 Astrid Bas as Cécile, la soeur
 Jacqueline Jehanneuf as Alice
 Françoise Bertin

References

External links

1999 films
1990s French-language films
1999 drama films
French drama films
Films directed by Benoît Jacquot
1990s French films